is a public park in the Himonya region of Meguro Ward in Tokyo, Japan.

History
Himonya Pond is at the center of the park. It is also the water source of the Tachiai River along with Shimizu Pond in Shimizuike Park in the same ward.

Facilities
 Playground equipment and trees around Himonya Pond
 Children's Animal Square — you can touch animals such as ponies, dogs and rabbits
 Himonya Gymnasium (tennis courts, gymnasium, baseball field)
 Boating area — It is possible to row on Himonya Pond (fee charged)

Access
 By train: 6 minutes’ walk from Gakugei-daigaku Station on the Tōkyū Tōyoko Line.

Gallery

See also
 Parks and gardens in Tokyo
 National Parks of Japan

References

 Website of Meguro City (in Japanese)

External links
 Website of Recruit Lifestyle (in Japanese)
Parks and gardens in Tokyo